David Sasson is an Israeli diplomat who twice served as Ambassador to Greece (the Jewish Telegraphic Agency states he is Israel’s second ambassador to Greece because “extended de jure recognition to Israel only last May. The previous representative, though of ambassadorial rank, could function only on the consular level.”) and was the first Israeli ambassador to the Federal Republic of Yugoslavia.

References

Ambassadors of Israel to Greece